Graeme Connal (born 12 September 1969) is a Scottish curler and world champion. He won a gold medal at the 1991 World Curling Championships in Winnipeg. He received a gold medal at the 2007 European Curling Championships in Füssen. He was skip for the Scottish team that received a silver medal at the 1990 World Junior Curling Championships in Portage la Prairie.

Connal was educated at Craigclowan Preparatory School in Perth, Scotland.

Teammates
2010 Vancouver Olympic Games
David Murdoch, Skip
Ewan MacDonald, Third
Peter Smith, Second
Euan Byers, Lead

References

External links

 Video: 

1969 births
Living people
Scottish male curlers
British male curlers
World curling champions
European curling champions
Olympic curlers of Great Britain
Curlers at the 2010 Winter Olympics
People educated at Craigclowan Preparatory School